Wooler is a small town in Northumberland, England.

Wooler may also refer to:
 Wooler, Ontario, a community in Quinte West, Ontario, Canada
 Wooler (motorcycles), a UK manufacturer of motorcycles and other vehicles
 Wooler (name), a surname (including a list of people with that name)

See also 
 Wooller (disambiguation)